Daughters of Desire is a 1929 American silent drama film directed by Burton L. King and starring Irene Rich, Richard Tucker and June Nash.

Plot

Cast
 Irene Rich		
 Richard Tucker	
 June Nash	
 Julius Molnar
 Jackie Searl	
 William Scott

References

Bibliography
 Munden, Kenneth White. The American Film Institute Catalog of Motion Pictures Produced in the United States, Part 1. University of California Press, 1997.

External links
 

1929 films
1929 drama films
1920s English-language films
American silent feature films
Silent American drama films
American black-and-white films
Films directed by Burton L. King
1920s American films